Dobrujan Bulgarians (Bulgarian: Добруджанци or Добруджански българи) — also spelled Dobrudžans, Dobrudzans, and Dobrudjans — is a regional, ethnographic group of ethnic Bulgarians, inhabiting or originating from Dobruja. Today, the larger part of this population is concentrated in Southern Dobruja, but much is spread across the whole of Bulgaria and the diaspora. Until the early 1940s, the Dobrujan Bulgarians lived also in the whole of Dobruja, part of the Ottoman Empire at the past and part of the Kingdom of Romania then. In September 1940, the governments of Bulgaria and Kingdom of Romania agreed to a population exchange according to the Treaty of Craiova. The Bulgarian population in Northern Dobruja was expelled into Bulgaria-controlled Southern Dobruja, today Dobrich Province and Silistra Province.

Notable Dobrujan Bulgarians
 Dora Gabe, poet
 Adriana Budevska, actress
 Ivailo Petrov, writer
 Miroslav Kostadinov, singer
 Khristo Ivanov, organic chemist
 Panayot Cherna, poet
 Dimitar Spisarevski, fighter pilot
 Preslava, singer

See also
Bulgarians
Bulgarians in Romania
Dobrujan Germans
Internal Dobrujan Revolutionary Organisation

References

Dobruja
People from Dobrich Province
People from Silistra Province
Bulgarian people by ethnographic region
Ethnic groups in Bulgaria